Prothalotia is a genus of sea snails, marine gastropod mollusks in the subfamily Cantharidinae of the family Trochidae, the top snails.

Distribution
The species in this genus occurs off Japan and Australia.

Species
Species within the genus Prothalotia include:
 Prothalotia chlorites (Philippi, 1846)
 Prothalotia flindersi (Fischer, 1878)
 Prothalotia lehmanni (Menke, 1843)
 Prothalotia lesueuri Fischer, 1880
 Prothalotia porteri (Iredale, 1940)
 Prothalotia pulcherrima (W. Wood, 1828)
 Prothalotia ramburi (Crosse, 1864)
 Prothalotia suturalis (Adams, 1853)

The Indo-Pacific Molluscan Database also includes the following species with names in current use :
 Prothalotia pyrgos Philippi, 1849
 Prothalotia serpentina (Quoy in Kiener, 1859)

Species brought into synonymy
 Prothalotia baudini (Fischer, 1878): synonym of Calthalotia baudini (P. Fischer, 1878)
 Prothalotia boninensis Okutani, 2001: synonym of Kanekotrochus boninensis (Okutani, 2001)
 Prothalotia comtessi Iredale, 1931: synonym of Calthalotia comtessi (Iredale, 1931)
 Prothalotia nitens Kiener, L.C., 1859: synonym of  Prothalotia lehmanni (Menke, 1843)
 Prothalotia pulcherrimus (Wood, 1828): synonym of Cantharidus pulcherrimus (Wood, 1828)
 Prothalotia strigata (Adams, 1853): synonym of Calthalotia strigata (A. Adams, 1853)
 Prothalotia sulcosa Adams, A., 1851: synonym of  Prothalotia lehmanni (Menke, 1843)

References

 Cotton, B.C., 1959. South Australian Mollusca. Archaeogastropoda. Govt. Printer, Adelaide
 Iredale, T. & McMichael, D.F., 1962 [31/Dec/1962]. A reference list of the marine Mollusca of New South Wales. Mem. Aust. Mus., 11:0-0.

External links

 
Trochidae
Gastropod genera